"Until You Were Gone" is a song by American DJ duos the Chainsmokers and Tritonal, featuring vocals from American singer Emily Warren. It is the fourth single from the former duo's debut EP Bouquet. The song was originally released on September 18, 2015. The music video was released on November 23, 2015. The song managed to peak at number 21 on the US Dance/Electronic Songs chart, and number 55 on the 2016 Dance/Electronic Songs year-end chart.

The song is featured on the soundtrack for NHL 17.

Music video
The music video was released on November 23, 2015, through The Chainsmokers' Vevo account on YouTube.

The video portrays the Chainsmokers and Tritonal attempting to each gain the attention of the same girl (who is a gym instructor). They all try their best to impress her, but in the end, she ignores them all for someone else.

Charts

Weekly charts

Year-end charts

Certifications

References

2015 singles
2015 songs
The Chainsmokers songs
Disruptor Records singles
Emily Warren songs
Song recordings produced by the Chainsmokers
Songs written by Andrew Taggart
Songs written by Emily Warren